Winter Rose may refer to:
Winter rose, alternative name for the plant hellebore
Winter Rose (novel), a 1996 fantasy novel by Patricia A. McKillip
The Winter Rose, a novel by Jennifer Donnelly
A Winter Rose, a 2014 film directed by Riz Story
Winter Rose (band), a Canadian hard rock band
Winter Rose (album), 1989
A Winter Rose, a carol composed by Alan Rees
Winter (Winter Rose / Duet), a 2011 single released by South Korean duo Tohoshinki
"Winter Rose/Love Awake", a song by Paul McCartney from Back to the Egg
"Winter Rose", a song by Fairground Attraction, the B-side to "A Smile in a Whisper"
"Winter Rose", a song by The Bees from the 2010 album Every Step's a Yes 
"Winter Rose", a song composed by Karliene, from the album "The Ballad of Anne Boleyn"